Xiangliu, known in the Classic of Mountains and Seas as Xiangyao, is a venomous nine-headed snake monster that brings floods and destruction in Chinese mythology.

Xiangliu may be depicted with his body coiled on itself. The nine heads are arranged differently in different representations. Modern depictions resemble the hydra with each head on a separate neck. Older wood-cuts show the heads clustered on a single neck, either side-by-side or in a stack three high, facing three directions.

Legend 

According to the Classic of Mountains and Seas (Shanhaijing), Xiangliu (Xiangyao) was a minister of the snake-like water deity Gonggong. Xiangliu devastated the ecology everywhere he went. He was so gluttonous that all nine heads would feed at the same meal. Everywhere he rested or breathed upon (or that his tongue touched, depending on the telling) became boggy with poisonously bitter water, devoid of human and animal life. When Gonggong received orders to punish people with floods, Xiangliu was proud to contribute to their troubles. Eventually, Xiangliu was killed, in some versions of the story by Yu the Great, whose other labors included ending the Great Flood of China, in others by Nüwa after he was defeated by Zhurong. The Shanhaijing says his blood stank to the point it was impossible to grow grain in the land it soaked and the area flooded, making it uninhabitable. Eventually Yu had to restrain the waters in a pond, over which the Sky Lords built their pavilions. 

Sun Jiayi identified Xiangliu as an eel:  

An oral version of the Xiangliu myth, in which Xiangliu is depicted as a nine-headed serpent responsible for floods and other harm, was collected from Sichuan as late as 1983.

See also 
 Chinese mythology
 Night at the Museum: Secret of the Tomb
 Yamata no Orochi

References

Citations

Bibliography 
 
Eberhard, Wolfram. 1968. The Local Cultures of South and East China. E. J. Brill.
 

Human-headed mythical creatures
Legendary serpents
Mythical many-headed creatures
Yaoguai
Classic of Mountains and Seas